Hugh Davidson is the name of:

 Hugh Davidson (actor), American actor and screenwriter
 Hugh Davidson (American football) (1928–2020), American football coach and scout
 Hugh Davidson (footballer) (born 1980), Scottish footballer
 Hugh Davidson (composer) (1930–2014), Canadian composer, music critic and arts administrator
 Hugh Davidson (cricketer) (1907–1960), Australian cricketer
 Hugh Davidson (marketer) British marketing author and businessman